St. Louis Correctional Facility (SLF) is a prison located in Saint Louis, Michigan. The facility is operated by the Michigan Department of Corrections.

Facility
The prison was opened in 1999 and has seven housing units, occupying , used for Michigan Department of Corrections male prisoners 18 years of age and older. Six of the housing units are used by the general prison population, one of which is an Adaptive Skills Residential Program (ASRP) Unit. There is also one housing unit, which houses up to 96 prisoners, that is used for segregating inmates from the general prison population. Onsite facilities provide for food service, health care, facility maintenance, storage, and prison administration.

Security
The facility is surrounded by double fences with razor-ribbon wire and guard towers. Electronic detection systems, closed-circuit television (CCTV), and patrol vehicles are also utilized to maintain perimeter security.

Services
The facility offers libraries, barbering, handicrafts, education programs, substance-abuse treatment, psychotherapy, and religious services to the inmates. Onsite medical and dental care, provided by mini-clinics in each housing unit, is supplemented by local hospitals and the Duane L. Waters Hospital in Jackson, Michigan.

See also

 List of Michigan state prisons

References

External links
 
 Michigan Department of Corrections

Prisons in Michigan
Buildings and structures in Gratiot County, Michigan
1999 establishments in Michigan